Marko Petkovšek is a Slovenian mathematician, born: 1955, working mainly in symbolic computation.
He is a professor of discrete and computational mathematics at the University of Ljubljana. He completed his Ph.D. at Carnegie Mellon University
under the supervision of Dana Scott. He is best known for Petkovšek's algorithm. Together with Herbert Wilf and Doron Zeilberger he wrote the book A = B.

External links
 "A = B"
 

1955 births
Carnegie Mellon University alumni
Living people
21st-century Slovenian mathematicians
Academic staff of the University of Ljubljana
20th-century Slovenian mathematicians